Political Takeout is a weekly, 30-minute UK politics and comedy podcast hosted by Rupert Myers and Bobby Friedman in association with The Independent. The show features a recurring comic feature presented by Lembit Öpik. Previous guests of the show have included Alan Johnson, Matthew Parris, Stella Creasy, and Hugo Rifkind among others. Younger political commentators like Tim Stanley and Rowenna Davis are regularly invited on.

The show regularly hosts segments with a comic element, featuring broadcasters such as Sam Delaney and Rich Peppiatt. Interviews with Jonathan Aitken and Vicky Pryce have been reported elsewhere.

Hosts
 Rupert Myers
 Bobby Friedman
 A comedy slot with Lembit Öpik

See also 

 Political podcast

References

External links
 

Audio podcasts
2013 podcast debuts
Political podcasts
British podcasts